The White Tiger is a novel by Indian author Aravind Adiga. It was published in 2008 and won the 40th Booker Prize the same year. The novel provides a darkly humorous perspective of India's class struggle in a globalized world as told through a retrospective narration from Balram Halwai, a village boy. The novel examines issues of the Hindu religion, caste, loyalty, corruption and poverty in India.

The novel has been well-received, making the New York Times bestseller list in addition to winning the Booker Prize. Aravind Adiga, 33 at the time, was the second youngest writer as well as the fourth debut writer to win the prize.  Adiga says his novel "attempt[s]
to catch the voice of the men you meet as you travel through India — the voice of the colossal underclass."  According to Adiga, the exigence for The White Tiger was to capture the unspoken voice of people from "the Darkness" – the impoverished areas of rural India, and he "wanted to do so without sentimentality or portraying them as
mirthless humorless weaklings as they are usually."

Plot summary
Balram Halwai narrates his life in a letter, written in seven consecutive nights and addressed to the Chinese Premier, Wen Jiabao. In his letter, Balram explains how he, the son of a rickshaw puller, escaped a life of servitude to become a successful businessman, describing himself as an entrepreneur.

Balram was born in a rural village in Gaya district, where he lived with his grandmother, parents, brother and extended family. He is a smart child but is forced to leave school in order to help pay for his cousin's dowry and begins to work in a teashop with his brother in Dhanbad. While working there he begins to learn about India's government and economy from the customers' conversations. Balram describes himself as a bad servant but a good listener and decides to become a driver.

After learning how to drive, Balram finds a job driving Ashok, the son of one of Laxmangarh's landlords. He takes over the job of the main driver,  from a small car to a heavy-luxury described Honda City. He stops sending money back to his family and disrespects his grandmother during a trip back to his village. Balram moves to New Delhi with Ashok and his wife Pinky Madam. Throughout their time in Delhi, Balram is exposed to extensive corruption, especially in the government. In Delhi, the contrast between the poor and the wealthy is made even more evident by their proximity to one another.

One night Pinky Madam takes the wheel from Balram, while drunk, hits something in the road and drives away; we are left to assume that she has killed a child. Ashok's family puts pressure on Balram to confess that he had been driving alone. Ashok becomes increasingly involved in bribing government officials for the benefit of the family coal business. Balram then decides that killing Ashok will be the only way to escape India's Rooster Coop – Balram's metaphor for describing the oppression of India's poor, just as roosters in a coop at the market watch themselves get slaughtered one by one, but are unable or unwilling to break out of the cage. Similarly, Balram too is portrayed as being trapped in the metaphorical Rooster Coop: his family controls what he does and society dictates how he acts.

After killing Ashok by stabbing him with a broken bottle and stealing the large bribe Ashok was carrying with him, Balram moves to Bangalore, where he bribes the police in order to help start his own taxi business.

Just like Ashok, Balram pays off a family whose son one of his taxi drivers hit and killed. Balram explains that his own family was almost certainly killed by Ashok's relatives as retribution for his murder. At the end of the novel, Balram rationalizes his actions and considers that his freedom is worth the lives of his family and of Ashok. And thus ends the letter to Jiabao, letting the reader think of the dark humour of the tale, as well as the idea of life as a trap introduced by the writer.

Themes

Globalization
The White Tiger takes place in a time in which increased technology has led to world globalization, and India is no exception.  In the 21st century, India has had one of the fastest growing economies. Specifically Americanization in India has played its role in the plot, since it provides an outlet for Balram to alter his caste. To satisfy Pinky's want for American culture, Ashok, Pinky, and Balram simply move to Gurgaon instead of going to back to America. Globalization has assisted in the creation of an American atmosphere in India.  Ashok justifies this move by explaining "Today it’s the modernest suburb of Delhi-National Capital Region. American Express, Microsoft, all the big American companies have offices there. The main road is full of shopping malls—each mall has a cinema inside!  So if Pinky Madam missed America, this was the best place to bring her". By blackmailing Ram Persad, the other driver, Balram is promoted and drives Ashok and Pinky to their new home.
        	
Ashok is even convinced India is surpassing the US, "There are so many more things I could do here than in New York now...The way things are changing in India now, this place is going to be like America in ten years".  Balram is noticing the rapid growth as well. From the beginning of his story he knows that in order to rise above his caste he should become an entrepreneur. Although his taxi service is not an international business, Balram plans to keep up with the pace of globalization and change his trade when need be. "I‘m always a man who sees ‘tomorrow’ when others see ‘today.’"  Balram's recognition of the increasing competition resulting from globalization contributes to his corruption.

Individualism
Throughout the book, there are references to how Balram is very different from those back in his home environment. He is referred to as the "white tiger" (which also happens to be the title of the book). A white tiger symbolizes power in East Asian cultures, such as in Vietnam. It is also a symbol for freedom and individuality. Balram is seen as different from those he grew up with. He is the one who got out of the "Darkness" and found his way into the "Light".

Freedom
In an interview with Aravind Adiga, he talked about how "The White Tiger" was a book about a man's quest for freedom. Balram, the protagonist in the novel, worked his way out of his low social caste (often referred to as "the Darkness") and overcame the social obstacles that limited his family in the past. Climbing up the social ladder, Balram sheds the weights and limits of his past and overcomes the social obstacles that keep him from living life to the fullest that he can. In the book, Balram talks about how he was in a rooster coop and how he broke free from his coop. The novel is somewhat a memory of his journey to finding his freedom in India's modern day capitalist society. Towards the beginning of the novel, Balram cites a poem from the Muslim poet Iqbal where he talks about slaves and says "They remain slaves because they can’t see what is beautiful in this world."  Balram sees himself embodying the poem and being the one who sees the world and takes it as he rises through the ranks of society, and in doing so finding his freedom.

Social class/classism
The book shows a modern day, capitalist Indian society with free market and free business. It also shows how it can create economic division. In India there are social classes and social castes. The novel portrays India's society as very negative towards the lower social caste. 

Sections of the novel highlight discrimination against Muslims, India's largest religious minority. The protagonist's employers demand to know if he is Muslim. Later in the novel, a character is blackmailed and later sacked when he is outed as a secretly practicing Islam.

The novel is based on the disparities of two worlds: darkness, inhabited by poor and underprivileged who cannot even meet the bare minimum; and the lighted world, inhabited by zamindars, politicians, businessmen etc. who shamelessly exploits the ones from darkness, making them poorer and grows their own grandeur. Balram refers to this as the "Darkness". When Balram was asked which caste he was from, he knew that it could ultimately cause a biased stance in his employer and determine the future of his employment. There is definitely a big difference seen in Balram's lower caste from back home and his current higher caste in their lifestyles, habits, and standards of living.

This novel highlights the socioeconomic discrimination in India's economic system, which creates divisions in Indian society. It limits opportunity, social mobility, health, and other rights and pleasures that should be given to all. There is a big difference in the amount of money spread around in society today and this book is alluding to that fact.

Reception
In 2020, Emma Lee-Potter of The Independent listed The White Tiger as one of the 12 best Indian novels.

Film adaptation

On April 5, 2018, Ramin Bahrani was finalised to direct and write the film adaptation for Netflix. On September 3, 2019, Rajkummar Rao, Priyanka Chopra, and Adarsh Gourav were cast in the film. The film was released on January 23, 2021 in select theatres and on Netflix. It was nominated for Academy Award for Best Adapted Screenplay in 2021.

References

External links
 Aravind Adiga Official website
 Adam Lively, Review in The Sunday Times
 David Mattin, Review in The Independent
 Sanjay Subrahmanyam, Review in the London Review of Books
 Interview with Aravind Adiga in Rediff
 Analysis of the novel at Let's talk about Bollywood
The White Tiger – uRead.com
 Roy, Pinaki. "Inside Tiger's Jaws: Rereading Aravind Adiga's The White Tiger". Booker Prize Winner Indian English Novels: A Kaleidoscopic Study. Eds. Nawale, A., and V. Bite. Jaipur: Aavishkar Publishers and Distributors, 2011. Pp. 164–78. .
The White Tiger at NPR

2008 Indian novels
Booker Prize-winning works
Books by Aravind Adiga
Epistolary novels
Picaresque novels
Novels set in India
Novels set in Bihar
Novels set in Bangalore
Atlantic Books books
2008 debut novels
Wen Jiabao family
Indian bildungsromans